Țintești is a commune in Buzău County, Muntenia, Romania. It is composed of four villages: Maxenu, Odaia Banului, Pogonele and Țintești.

In 2021, there was a proposal to unite Țintești with the city of Buzău. This would be part of the "Buzău Mare 2021" ("Greater Buzău 2021") project, aiming to double Buzău in size and to develop the city more extensively once united with Țintești. This new Buzău would have around 120,000 inhabitants and the planned A7 motorway would go through the middle of it. The idea came from the mayor of Buzău, Constantin Toma. On 26 September 2021, a referendum was done to decide this, and 43.03% of the inhabitants of Țintești voted on it. However, only 10.03% of those of Buzău did so, and given the low turnout, below the legal threshold of 30%, the results were considered null and Țintești and Buzău remained separate.

Notes

Communes in Buzău County
Localities in Muntenia